Dodona henrici, the white Punch, is a small but striking butterfly found in India that belongs to the Punches and Judies, that is, the family Riodinidae.

See also
List of butterflies of India
List of butterflies of India (Riodinidae)

References
 
 

Dodona (butterfly)
Butterflies of Asia